Epizoanthidae is a family of cnidarians.

Genera include:
 Epizoanthus Gray, 1867
 Paleozoanthus Carlgren, 1924 - taxon inquirendum
 Thoracactis Gravier, 1918

References

 
Macrocnemina
Cnidarian families